The Tiruviruttam is a hundred-verse poem composed by Nammalvar, a poet-saint of the Sri Vaishnava tradition. It is one of the many works present in the compilation known as the Naalayira Divya Prabandham. According to tradition, it is said to contain the quintessence of the Rigveda.

Structure 
The Tiruviruttam is framed as a love story that unfolds between an anonymous heroine (talaivi) and her beloved hero (talaivan), while friends, fortune tellers, bees, birds, and the poet’s own heart play important supporting roles, acting as messengers, lamenters, and audiences in the style of a story. According to some interpretations, this poem is regarded to take the form of a dramatic sequence, in which a few characters discuss the love of God, which is portrayed as the earthly love between a man and a woman. In this regard, the poet Nammalvar's yearning for God expresses itself through a woman's love-tossed heart pining for her omnipotent lover. Secular love for a man by a woman is framed as divine love for God himself in this work.

The Indologist David Shulman states that the hymns of the Tiruviruttam, "create a poetic or aesthetic world suffused by classical grammar".

Hymns 

The hymns of the Tiruviruttam are structured as a conversation, or a series of exchanges between the heroine of the poem and her friends. The first few hymns of this poem serve as an example of this format:

One of the responses of the heroine's friends is written thus:

See also 

 Tiruchanda Viruttam
 Tiruvaymoli
 Perumal Tirumoli

External links 
Tiruviruttam of Nammalvar

References 

Vaishnava texts
Naalayira Divya Prabandham
Tamil Hindu literature